Silvio Martinello (born 19 January 1963) is a retired road bicycle and track cyclist from Italy. He won the gold medal in the men's points race at the 1996 Summer Olympics in Atlanta, Georgia, followed by the bronze medal in the men's madison in Sydney, Australia alongside Marco Villa. He was a professional rider from 1986 to 2000.

Major results

Road

1983
 1st Giro del Belvedere
1989
 2nd Giro della Provincia di Reggio Calabria
 3rd Trofeo Laigueglia
1990
 1st Stage 3 Vuelta a España
1991
 1st Milano–Vignola
 1st Stage 18 Giro d'Italia
 1st Stage 4 Tirreno–Adriatico
 1st Stage 1 Giro del Trentino
 3rd Giro del Veneto
 7th Trofeo Pantalica
 8th Giro dell'Etna
1992
 1st Stage 3 Three Days of De Panne
1993 
 3rd Giro della Provincia di Reggio Calabria
1994 
 3rd E3 Prijs Vlaanderen
 3rd Grand Prix Pino Cerami
 5th GP Rik Van Steenbergen
 8th Scheldeprijs
1996
 Giro d'Italia
1st Stage 1 
Held  after Stages 1–2 & 4–5
Held  after Stages 1, 4–11 & 13
 4th Grand Prix of Aargau Canton
 10th Gent–Wevelgem
1997
 1st  Overall Giro di Puglia
1st Stage 2
 1st Stage 2 Tour of Galicia
 1st Stage 4 Setmana Catalana de Ciclisme
 3rd Giro dell'Etna
1998
 International Rheinland–Pfalz Rundfahrt
1st Stages 3b & 7 
 1st Stage 5 Four Days of Dunkirk
 2nd Giro della Provincia di Siracusa
 5th Overall Giro di Puglia
1999
 1st Stage 2 Tour de Suisse

References

External links
 
 

1963 births
Living people
Italian male cyclists
Cyclists at the 1984 Summer Olympics
Cyclists at the 1996 Summer Olympics
Cyclists at the 2000 Summer Olympics
Olympic cyclists of Italy
Olympic gold medalists for Italy
Olympic bronze medalists for Italy
Italian Giro d'Italia stage winners
Sportspeople from Padua
Olympic medalists in cycling
Tour de Suisse stage winners
UCI Track Cycling World Champions (men)
Medalists at the 1996 Summer Olympics
Medalists at the 2000 Summer Olympics
Italian track cyclists
Cyclists from the Province of Padua